The 2009–10 season of Unirea Urziceni began on 25 July with the first training session, led by the team's head coach Dan Petrescu. After several friendlies the first competitive game was the Romanian Supercup against CFR Cluj on 26 July 2009. The match ended 1–1 in regular time, but CFR Cluj managed to win the cup after the penalty shootout, in which Răzvan Pădureţu, Raul Rusescu and Sorin Frunză missed.

Unirea has made several squad changes, signing former Steaua captain Sorin Paraschiv, former Rapid captain Vasile Maftei and Antonio Semedo. Sorin Rădoi was loaned to Unirea Alba Iulia.

Pre-season and friendlies

Competitions

Overall record

Supercupa României

Liga I

League table

Results summary

Results by round

Matches

Cupa României

Round of 32

UEFA Champions League

Group stage

UEFA Europa League

Knockout phase

Round of 32

Players

Individual statistics

|}

Transfers

In

Out

Goals

Club

Coaching staff

References

FC Unirea Urziceni seasons
Unirea Urziceni